The  1934 German football championship, the 27th edition of the competition, was won by Schalke 04 by defeating 1. FC Nürnberg 2–1 in the final. It was Schalke's first championship, with five more titles to follow until 1942 and a seventh one in 1958. For Nuremberg, with five German championships to its name at the time, it marked the first time it lost a final but the club would go on to win its next title, the 1936 edition, after defeating Schalke in the semi-finals.

Schalke won the 1934 championship final late in the game after Nuremberg had gone 1–0 ahead In the 54th minute. Schalke equalised in the 87th and scored the winning goal three minutes later through Ernst Kuzorra.

Waldhof Mannheim's Otto Siffling became the top scorer of the 1934 championship with eleven goals, the first player to score double-didgid figures since interception of the competition in 1903.

Under the new Gauliga system, introduced after the Nazis came to power in 1933, the sixteen 1933–34 Gauliga champions competed in a group stage of four groups of four teams each, with the group winners advancing to the semi-finals. The two semi-final winners then contested the 1934 championship final. While the number of teams in the competition, sixteen, had remained the same as in the previous seasons, the modus had changed compare to 1933, when all games were played in the knock-out format and the competition was shorter.

Qualified teams
The teams qualified through the 1933–34 Gauliga season:

Competition

Group 1
Group 1 was contested by the champions of the Gauligas Brandenburg, Ostpreußen, Pommern and Schlesien:

Group 2
Group 2 was contested by the champions of the Gauligas Nordmark, Niedersachsen, Niederrhein and Westfalen:

Group 3
Group 3 was contested by the champions of the Gauligas Baden, Mittelrhein, Südwest and Württemberg:

Group 4
Group 4 was contested by the champions of the Gauligas Bayern, Hessen, Mitte and Sachsen:

Semi-finals

|align="center" style="background:#ddffdd" colspan=3|17 June 1934

|}

Final

|align="center" style="background:#ddffdd" colspan=3|24 June 1934

|}

References

Sources
 kicker Allmanach 1990, by kicker, page 164 & 177 - German championship

External links
 German Championship 1933–34 at weltfussball.de 
 German Championship 1934 at RSSSF

1
German
German football championship seasons